Maulvi Abdul Rahman Rashid (مولوي عبد الرحمن راشد) is an Afghan Taliban politician. Rashid is currently serving as acting Minister of Agriculture, Irrigation and Livestock as of 22 September 2021.

References

Year of birth missing (living people)
Living people
Taliban government ministers of Afghanistan